As of 2019, 10.5% of Americans were considered in poverty, according to the U.S Government's official poverty measure. People who are beneath and at the poverty line have different health risks than citizens above it, as well as different health outcomes. The impoverished population grapples with a plethora of challenges in physical health, mental health, and access to healthcare. Examining the divergences in health between the impoverished and their non-impoverished counterparts provides insight into the living conditions of those who live in poverty.

Poverty and physical health 
Poverty can affect health outcomes throughout a person's entire life. The affect may not always be expressed while an individual is impoverished. Mothers who are in poverty during their pregnancies may experience more health risks during their delivery, and their newborn may experience more health risks and markedly more behavioral problems during their development. Furthermore, children in poverty have worse health outcomes during adulthood. This effect is especially pronounced for specific ailments, such as heart disease and diabetes. The impact persists even if a youth escapes poverty by adulthood, suggesting that the stress of poverty encountered during childhood or adolescence has a lasting effect. Previous research has identified the labor environments of the impoverished as more likely to contain risk factors for illness and disability relative to their non-impoverished counterparts. Moreover, if an adult lives within an area deemed poverty-dense, they will have worse health outcomes, on average, than their peers who live in neighborhoods with less poverty. This outcome is observed even after controlling for factors like age, race, and lifestyle choices.   The implication is that the unique stresses of life within an impoverished community contribute to poorer health outcomes, even if the resident doesn't engage in any specific behavior detrimental to their health. Early into the COVID-19 pandemic in North America, being impoverished was associated with an increased likelihood of contracting COVID-19, as well as dying from it.

Poverty and mental health 
Poverty also has a complex relationship with mental health. Being in poverty may itself provoke a condition of elevated emotional stress, known as “poverty distress”.  Poverty is also a precursor or risk factor for mental illness, particularly mood disorders, such as depression and anxiety. Schizophrenia is also strongly associated with poverty, occurring most frequently in the poorest classes of people all over the world, especially in more unequal countries.  In a sort of reciprocating relationship, having mental illness is a major risk factor for being in poverty.  Having a mental illness may inhibit a person's ability to work or deter employees from hiring them.

A hypothesis known as “drift hypothesis”, posits that for people with psychiatric disorders (primarily schizophrenia), they tend to fall further down the socio-economic ladder as their condition reduces their functionality.  This hypothesis is an effort to establish that people with profoundly limiting psychiatric symptoms are more likely to descend economically, not that the financially challenged are more likely to present severe psychiatric disorders. People experiencing less severe symptoms are less likely to be affected by “drift”.  

With those in poverty having greater likelihood of suffering from mental illness, the benefit of access to clinical psychotherapy treatments has been explored. Despite numerous barriers for access to care for low-income individuals, there is evidence that those who do receive care respond with significant improvements. This research supports policy measures for improved outreach and access-to-care measures designed to benefit those with low-incomes and mental health disorders.

Health care effects 

Between 1987 and 2005, the number of people without health insurance in the United States rose from just over 30 million, to 46.6 million. At that time, 8.5% of people belonging to households that made over $75,000 annually were uninsured. For families earning $25,000 or less, that percentage rose to 24.4% uninsured. This figure exhibits how lack of access to care via health insurance disproportionately affects those in poverty.

Despite the cost of healthcare being an obstacle for those with relatively low incomes, research suggests that insurance coverage will not dramatically change outcomes related to physical health.  Access to Medicaid for low-income adults aided in diagnosis of metabolic disease, saw a reduction in diagnosis of mental health disorders, and reduced incurrence of “catastrophic medical costs” by patients dramatically. While these positive effects were observed, outcomes for heart disease, diabetes, and other physical health characteristics were not meaningfully improved. It has been posited that one year, the duration of the study, is an insufficient length to fully observe the divergent health outcomes that would be characteristic of an experiment with a lengthier time-table. Also, minorities have an excess amount of deaths due to diseases like cancer and cardiovascular disease compared to whites.

The medical-industrial complex also contributes to the difficulties of patients paying for medications and healthcare costs.

References 

Poverty in the United States
Health in the United States